89 (eighty-nine) is the natural number following 88 and preceding 90.

In mathematics 
89 is:

 the 24th prime number, following 83 and preceding 97.
 a Chen prime.
 a Pythagorean prime.
 the smallest Sophie Germain prime to start a Cunningham chain of the first kind of six terms, {89, 179, 359, 719, 1439, 2879}.
 an Eisenstein prime with no imaginary part and real part of the form .
 a Fibonacci number and thus a Fibonacci prime as well. The first few digits of its reciprocal coincide with the Fibonacci sequence due to the identity 

 a Markov number, appearing in solutions to the Markov Diophantine equation with other odd-indexed Fibonacci numbers.

M89 is the 10th Mersenne prime.

Although 89 is not a Lychrel number in base 10, it is unusual that it takes 24 iterations of the reverse and add process to reach a palindrome. Among the known non-Lychrel numbers in the first 10000 integers, no other number requires that many or more iterations. The palindrome reached is also unusually large.

There are exactly 1000 prime numbers between 1 and 892.

In science
Eighty-nine is:

 The atomic number of actinium.

In astronomy
Messier object M89, a magnitude 11.5 elliptical galaxy in the constellation Virgo.
The New General Catalogue object NGC 89, a magnitude 13.5 peculiar spiral galaxy in the constellation Phoenix and a member of Robert's Quartet.

In sports 
 The Oklahoma Redhawks, an American minor league baseball team, were formerly known as the Oklahoma 89ers (1962–1997). The number alludes to the Land Run of 1889, when the Unassigned Lands of Oklahoma were opened to white settlement. The team's home of Oklahoma City was founded during this event.
 In Rugby, an "89" or eight-nine move is a phase following a scrum, in which the number 8 catches the ball and transfers it to number 9 (scrum half).
 The Elite 89 Award is presented by the U.S. NCAA to the participant in each of the NCAA's 89 championship finals with the highest grade point average.
 89, a 2017 film about a football match, between Liverpool and Arsenal in 1989.

In other fields 

Eighty-nine is also:

The designation of Interstate 89, a freeway that runs from New Hampshire to Vermont
The designation of U.S. Route 89, a north–south highway that runs from Montana to Arizona
The ISBN Group Identifier for books published in Korea
"Pop Song 89" by R.E.M.
 A model of the Texas Instruments calculator TI-89
 California Proposition 89, a 2006 California ballot initiative on campaign finance reform
 The title of a currently-unreleased song by Bon Iver
 The greatest number of verses in a chapter of a book of the Bible other than the Book of Psalms—specifically Numbers chapter 7.
 The number of units of each colour in the board game Blokus
 The number of the French department Yonne
 Information Is Beautiful cites eighty-nine as one of the words censored on the Chinese internet.

See also
Hellin's law

References

Integers